The Teton Valley News, located in Driggs, Idaho, was founded in 1909. The Teton Valley News publishes weekly and serves the Valley's five towns with a variety of print and online products.

In January 2006, Pioneer Newspapers of Seattle acquired the paper from its previous owner, Grand Teton News, a group of Wyoming family owners including Gary and Sue Stevenson, Robb and Jen Hicks, and Tom and Annie Mullen. Pioneer sold its papers to Adams Publishing Group in 2017. Previous owners of the Teton Valley News have included Vern Craver in the 1990s, and Fred and Elizabeth McCabe of Jackson, Wyoming.

References

 http://www.tetonvalleynews.net/news/teton-valley-news-gets-new-publisher/article_e69abd9e-7f12-11df-90dd-001cc4c002e0.html

Newspapers published in Idaho